Moore is an extinct town in Chelan County, in the U.S. state of Washington. The GNIS classifies it as a populated place.

A post office called Moore was in operation from 1892 until 1955. J. Robert Moore, an early postmaster, gave the community his name.

References

Ghost towns in Washington (state)
Geography of Chelan County, Washington